Jonathan Kelvin Ball is professor of molecular virology at the University of Nottingham. His research relates to emerging viruses, viral vaccines and treatments, and blood-borne infections. He is also director of the Centre for Global Virus Research at the University of Nottingham.

He graduated from Bristol Polytechnic with a BSc in Applied Biological Sciences in 1987 and completed his PhD in virology at the University of Warwick in 1994, he competed on the 2019 University Challenge Christmas series for the latter institution,  and was  the subject of the BBC Radio 4 programme The Life Scientific, which was first broadcast on  30 July 2019.

References

External links 

Jonathan Ball on ResearchGate
Jonathan Ball on The Life Scientific

Year of birth missing (living people)
Living people
Alumni of the University of the West of England, Bristol
Alumni of the University of Warwick
British virologists
Academics of the University of Nottingham
HIV/AIDS researchers
Hepatitis researchers
Science communicators